This is a list of chapters for the manga series Beet the Vandel Buster.

The story is set in a world whose people are living under the rule of devils, or Vandels, who is able to manipulate monsters. The Vandel Busters are a group of people who hunt these devils.  Of them, the Zenon Squad is known to be the strongest busters on the continent. A young boy, Beet, dreams of joining the Zenon Squad. However, Beet's enthusiasm leads him to endanger the Zenon squad during a battle and they are defeated by the Vandel Beltose. The five dying busters sacrificed their life power to their five soul weapons, Saiga, which they gave to Beet. Years have passed since then and the young Vandel Buster, Beet, begins his adventure to carry out the Zenon Squad's will to put an end to the rule of Vandels.

The manga was published in Shueisha's Monthly Shōnen Jump in Japan from 2002 until September 2006, when Inada became ill. On December 17, 2015, it was reported that the manga will resume in the Spring 2016 issue of Jump SQ.Crown. The manga ran in Jump SQ. Crown until October 2016 and it is currently published in Jump SQ.Rise.

Viz Media published the first twelve volumes in English.

Volume list

References

Beet the Vandel Buster